Christopher Tangeni Mbamba (born 30 April 1992) is a Swedish former professional footballer who plays as a winger.

Born in Zimbabwe, he represented Sweden at under-17 level. He came through the youth-team at IFK Göteborg and was an unused substitute in the 2010 Svenska Supercupen final. He moved on to Qviding FIF the following year, where he spent two seasons. He moved to Norway in 2014 and spent the next three years with Medkila IL, Alta IF and Hamarkameratene. In July 2016 he was signed by English club Port Vale, though left after the Vale were relegated out of EFL League One. He signed with Oskarshamns AIK in April 2018, before moving on to IK Oddevold in January 2019. He dropped down a division to join Assyriska BK in January 2020.

Club career

Sweden
Mbamba was born in Zimbabwe, and spent time with Hellas FC before he moved to Sweden to join the youth ranks of IFK Göteborg. He was vice-captain of the highly rated IFK Göteborg Under-19 team that won the Junior Allsvenskan Elite Southern Division in 2011 and reached the semi-finals of the Swedish Under-19 National Championships play-offs, losing to Kalmar FF 6-4 on penalties. He was also regularly part of the first-team squad and was an unused substitute in the 2010 Svenska Supercupen defeat to AIK at Råsunda Stadium, though did not make an appearance in a competitive match. After the 2011 Allsvenskan season he was released, and subsequently spent two seasons with Qviding FIF of Division 1.

Norway
In 2014, he joined Norwegian side Medkila IL in the 2. divisjon, and scored two goals in 14 league games. He signed with Norwegian First Division side Alta IF in August 2014. However following their relegation, he went to Hamarkameratene ahead of the 2015 season. He damaged his cruciate ligaments in July 2015, and only returned to full fitness midway through the 2016 campaign. He recovered well, and in a reserve team match managed to provide an assist for all six goals in a 6–0 win over Kattem on 15 May. Hamkam manager Stein Arne Ingelstad said that Mbamba was a popular player who was "a little frustrating when he has not used his exceptional speed to pass defenders when he had the opportunity".

Port Vale
He signed with EFL League One club Port Vale in July 2016. He made his professional debut on 6 August, after coming on for Anthony de Freitas as a 57th-minute substitute in a 0–0 draw with Bradford City. He made 11 appearances across the 2016–17 season, and left the club in May 2017 after new manager Michael Brown agreed a settlement on the final 12 months of his contract.

Return to Sweden
Mbamba returned to Sweden and on 5 April 2018 signed with Division 1 club Oskarshamns AIK. Oskarshamns finished second in the Södra table in the 2018 season and qualified to the promotion play-offs, but failed to reach the Superettan after losing out to Varbergs BoIS on away goals; Mbamba was a late substitute in both legs. He switched to divisional rivals Oskarshamns AIK in the off-season.

On 28 January 2020, Mbamba signed with Division 2 side Assyriska BK. The club announced in June 2020 that Mbamba had left the club.

International career
Mbamba was born in Zimbabwe to a Namibian father, and a Kenyan mother. He moved to Sweden at a young age, and represented the Sweden under-17s. In February 2019, Mbamba declared his intention to represent Kenya. He was granted a Kenyan passport the following month.

Style of play
Mbamba is versatile player who can play as a winger with tremendous pace and also as a box-to-box centre midfielder.

Career statistics

Honours
IFK Göteborg
Svenska Supercupen runner-up: 2010

References

1992 births
Living people
Sportspeople from Harare
Swedish footballers
Sweden youth international footballers
Zimbabwean footballers
Swedish people of Kenyan descent
Swedish sportspeople of African descent
Swedish people of Namibian descent
Zimbabwean people of Kenyan descent
Zimbabwean people of Namibian descent
Zimbabwean emigrants to Sweden
Association football wingers
IFK Göteborg players
Qviding FIF players
Medkila IL (men) players
Alta IF players
Hamarkameratene players
Port Vale F.C. players
Oskarshamns AIK players
IK Oddevold players
Assyriska BK players
Ettan Fotboll players
Division 2 (Swedish football) players
Norwegian First Division players
English Football League players
Swedish expatriate footballers
Swedish expatriate sportspeople in Norway
Swedish expatriate sportspeople in England
Expatriate footballers in England
Expatriate footballers in Norway